Keagan Glade (born 12 May 1999) is a South African rugby union player for the  in the Currie Cup. His regular position is prop.

Glade was named in the  side for the 2022 Currie Cup Premier Division.

References

South African rugby union players
Living people
Rugby union props
Golden Lions players
Sharks (Currie Cup) players
1999 births